Geisy Daniela Patiño González (born  in Sucre, Venezuela) is a  Venezuelan born, Spanish female volleyball player, playing as a central. She was part of the Spain women's national volleyball team that competed at the 2007 Women's European Volleyball Championship.

Career
She won the 1997-98 Argentinian championship with Gimnasia y Esgrima de Buenos Aires, where she played with compatriot Graciela Márquez.

Patiño spent from 1998-99 to 2001-02 with the Spanish club A Pinguela. She then played two seasons for Calzada Gijon, playing in the 2003-04 with her Venezuelan countrymates Carolyn Orozco and Desiree Glod.

Played for CV Albacete for the 2004–05, She later played for CV Benidorm for the 2005-06 until the 2007–08, before returning to CV Albacete. She then returned to CV Benidorm.

Clubs
  Gimnasia y Esgrima de Buenos Aires (1997-1998)
  Agrupación Deportiva A Pinguela (1998-2002)
  Calzada Gijon (2002-2004)
  CV Albacete (2004-2005)
  Visual Home Benidorm (2005-2008)
  CV Albacete (2008-2009)
  Valeriano Allès Menorca (2009-2010)
  Playas de Benidorm (2010-2011)
  Valeriano Allès Menorca (2011-2012)
  Naturhouse Ciudad de Logroño (2014-2016)

References

External links
 CEV Profile

1978 births
Living people
Venezuelan women's volleyball players
Spanish women's volleyball players
People from Sucre
Central American and Caribbean Games bronze medalists for Venezuela
Competitors at the 1998 Central American and Caribbean Games
Central American and Caribbean Games medalists in volleyball
People from Sucre (state)